On May 9, 2019, French special operations forces conducted a rescue operation in Northern Burkina Faso, that resulted in the deaths of two French petty officers, four out of six gunmen, and the recovery of all four hostages of French, American, and South Korean nationality. The operation was conducted by approximately 24 operators from Commando Hubert, the 1st Marine Infantry Parachute Regiment, and the Air Parachute Commando n° 10, CPA 10, with intelligence and overhead support from the United States Military.

Background 
The hostage situation included four hostages of French, American, and South Korean nationality. Patrick Picque and Laurent Lassimouillas, two French music teachers, were kidnapped on May 1st while vacationing in Pendjari National Park in Benin. Their tour guide was found killed and their car had been burned. Meanwhile, the South Korean and American hostages, whose identities have not been released, were abducted while crossing together from Benin into Burkina Faso, about one month earlier.

Rescue 

While the terrorist organization behind the hostage crisis was unidentified, French military believe that the hostages were about to be handed to the Macina Liberation Front, a terrorist organization in Mali. Before the rescue, the abductors had been moving northbound through Burkina Faso, but had set up camp overnight in the Sahel region.

The hostage rescue occurred during the night on May 9, 2019. French special forces approached the abductors' camp, covering 200 meters of open ground before being noticed 10 meters away. Two special forces soldiers, Cédric de Pierrepont, 32, and Alain Bertoncello, 27, died during the rescue, as did four of the militants. Both operatives belonged to Commando d'Action Sous-Marine Hubert, or CASM.

On January 12 and 13, security forces conducted a rescue operation in which 66 people were rescued.

Aftermath

Following the rescue, the two Frenchmen and the South Korean were received by President Emmanuel Macron at Villacoublay airport. The former captives expressed their thanks to the soldiers that died and to the French and Burkinabe authorities for their roles in the rescue.

On May 14, 2019, a national tribute was be held in Paris in honour of the two soldiers that died in the rescue mission.

References 

hostage rescue
2019 in international relations
May 2019 events in Africa
Military operations involving France
Military operations involving the United States
Hostage rescue operations